This is a comprehensive list of victories of the  cycling team. The races are categorized according to the UCI Continental Circuits rules. The team was in the National category from 1974 to 2010, then the UCI Continental category from 2011 to 2015 then up to UCI Professional Continental from 2016 till present.

Pre 2008

2008 – VC La Pomme Marseille
Stage 2 Les 3 Jours de Vaucluse, Julien Antomarchi
Stage 4 Tour de Bretagne Cycliste, Julien Antomarchi

2009 – VC La Pomme Marseille
Stage 2 Giro della Valle d'Aosta, Yannick Marie

2010 – VC La Pomme Marseille

2011 – VC La Pomme Marseille

Stage 2 Tour du Haut Var, Julien Antomarchi
Stage 3 Circuit des Ardennes, Benjamin Giraud
Stage 1 (TTT) La Coupe du Président de la Ville de Grudziądz
Stage 1 (TTT) Tour de Berlin
 Overall Volta ao Alentejo, Evaldas Šiškevičius
Stage 3, Evaldas Šiškevičius
Stage 1  Tour of Hainan, Justin Jules

2012 – La Pomme Marseille
Paris–Camembert, Pierre-Luc Périchon
Stage 3 Le Tour de Bretagne Cycliste, Evaldas Šiškevičius
Stage 5 Le Tour de Bretagne Cycliste, Thomas Vaubourzeix
Stage 2 Tour du Limousin, Evaldas Šiškevičius
Grand Prix de la Somme, Evaldas Šiškevičius

2013 – La Pomme Marseille

Grand Prix Cycliste la Marseillaise, Justin Jules
Stage 6 Tour de Taiwan, Benjamin Giraud
Stage 1 Mzansi Tour, Julien Antomarchi
Stage 5 Four Days of Dunkirk, Yannick Martinez
Stage 1 Route du Sud, Yannick Martinez
Stage 10 Tour of Qinghai Lake, Benjamin Giraud
Polynormande, José Gonçalves
 National Under-23 Time Trial Championships, Yoann Paillot
Stages 2 & 5 Tour of China I, Benjamin Giraud

2014 – La Pomme Marseille

 Overall Tour de Taiwan, Rémy Di Gregorio
Stage 2, Benjamin Giraud
Stage 5 Tour d'Azerbaïdjan, Justin Jules
Stage 5 Tour of Qinghai Lake, Thomas Vaubourzeix
Stage 1 Tour Alsace, Grégoire Tarride
 Overall Tour of Hainan, Julien Antomarchi
Stages 4 & 7, Julien Antomarchi

2015 Marseille 13–KTM

Paris–Camembert, Julien Loubet
 Overall Circuit des Ardennes, Evaldas Šiškevičius
Stage 3, Team time trial
 Overall Four Days of Dunkirk, Ignatas Konovalovas
Stage 5 Tour of Hainan, Benjamin Giraud
Overall Tour of Yancheng Coastal Wetlands, Evaldas Šiškevičius
Stage 1, Evaldas Šiškevičius

2016 – Delko–Marseille Provence KTM
Stage 4 Tour des Fjords, Asbjørn Kragh Andersen
 Overall Tour of Taihu Lake, Leonardo Duque
Stage 7, Leonardo Duque

2017 – Delko–Marseille Provence KTM
Classic Sud-Ardèche, Mauro Finetto
Stage 1 La Tropicale Amissa Bongo, Mikel Aristi

2018 – Delko–Marseille Provence KTM

Stages 2 & 5 La Tropicale Amissa Bongo, Brenton Jones
 Overall Sharjah Tour, Javier Moreno
Stage 2 Tour La Provence, Rémy Di Gregorio
Stage 2 Tour de l'Ain, Javier Moreno
 National Time Trial Championship, Joseph Areruya
 National Road Race Championship, Nikolay Mihaylov
Stage 2 Tour of Qinghai Lake, Brenton Jones

2019 – Delko–Marseille Provence

 National Criterium Championships, Brenton Jones
Stage 1 Tour of Rwanda, Alessandro Fedeli
Stage 6 Tour of Rwanda, Przemysław Kasperkiewicz
Ronde van Limburg, Eduard-Michael Grosu
 National Time Trial Championship, Joseph Areruya
 National Road Race Championship, Ramūnas Navardauskas
Stage 2 Tour of Qinghai Lake, Brenton Jones
Stage 3 & 6 Tour of Qinghai Lake, Eduard-Michael Grosu
Stage 2 Okolo Slovenska, Eduard-Michael Grosu
Stage 2 CRO Race, Eduard-Michael Grosu
Stage 5 Tour of Taihu Lake, Brenton Jones

2020 – Nippo–Delko–One Provence

Stages 3 & 6 La Tropicale Amissa Bongo, Biniam Girmay
Stage 6 Tour de Langkawi, Hideto Nakane
Stage 2 Tour of Rwanda, Mulu Hailemichael
Stage 8 Tour of Rwanda, José Manuel Díaz
Stage 3 Tour of Bulgaria, Pierre Barbier
 National Time trial Championship, Evaldas Šiškevičius
Stage 4 Tour du Limousin, Alessandro Fedeli
 Young rider classification Volta a Portugal, Simon Carr
Prueba Villafranca de Ordizia, Simon Carr

2021 – Delko
 Overall Presidential Tour of Turkey, José Manuel Díaz
Stage 5, José Manuel Díaz
 National Time trial Championship, Evaldas Šiškevičius
 National Road Race Championships, Dušan Rajović
Stage 5 Tour Poitou-Charentes en Nouvelle-Aquitaine, Clément Carisey

Supplementary statistics
Sources

References

Cycling teams established in 1974
VCL